Mark Browne (born 19 November 1954) is a former Australian rules footballer who played for Geelong in the Victorian Football League (now known as the Australian Football League).

His daughters Madi and Kelsey are both Australian international netball players.

References 

1954 births
Living people
Geelong Football Club players
Geelong West Football Club players
Australian rules footballers from Victoria (Australia)